Carol Burnett is an American comedienne and actress known for her performances in film, television and theater.

Films 
Note: Made-for-TV movies are listed in the Television credits section.

Television

Theatre

References

Bibliography

External links

Carol Burnett  Video produced by Makers: Women Who Make America
Carol Burnett news on Topix.net
John Foster Dulles song
Carol Burnett, The Ed Sullivan Show
Carol Burnett at Emmys.com
Interview with Carol Burnett. Accessed February 11, 2017.
Carol Burnett at The Museum of Broadcast Communications